Parliamentary elections were held in Latvia on 14 and 15 July 1940, alongside simultaneous elections in Estonia and Lithuania, following the Soviet occupation of the three countries. The Communist Party of Latvia was legalised and it created the "Latvian Working People's Bloc" (which consisted almost entirely of the Communists) to take part in the elections. It was the sole permitted participant in the elections as an attempt to include the Democratic Bloc (Demokrātiskais bloks), an alliance of all now-banned Latvian parties except the Social Democratic Workers' Party, on the ballot was suppressed. The main figures of the Democratic Bloc were either arrested and deported (Atis Ķeniņš, Pēteris Berģis and Jānis Bankavs) or shot (Hugo Celmiņš) shortly afterwards, while a few (Voldemārs Zāmuēls, Jānis Breikšs) managed to escape the repression by fleeing from the country. As was the case in Estonia and Lithuania, the elections were blatantly rigged, with the Working People’s Bloc winning every seat.

Results

Aftermath
Along with its sister parliaments in Estonia (Riigivolikogu) and Lithuania (Liaudies Seimas), the newly elected People's Parliament (Tautas Saeima) convened on 21 July. It declared Latvia a Soviet republic and requested admission to the Soviet Union on the same day. The request was approved by the Soviet government on 5 August. This move was illegal under the constitution, which stipulated that a major change to the basic constitutional order could only be enacted after two-thirds of the electorate approved it via a plebiscite. Soviet sources maintained that the election marked the culmination of a socialist revolution that the Latvian people carried out free of Soviet influence, and the "People's Parliament" was a democratic institution of the Latvian people that ultimately voted to join the Soviet Union. However, Baltic and Western sources maintained that the election was merely an attempt to give legal sanction to a Soviet occupation. 

When Latvia declared independence in 1990, it contended that the 1940 election was illegal on several counts. According to the declaration, the election was conducted on the basis of an unconstitutional and illegal election law, and the election results were heavily falsified. It also noted that the Working People's Bloc was the only party allowed to contest the election out of 17 that submitted lists, and accused the bloc of deceiving the people about its intention to make Latvia part of the Soviet Union. It also noted that under the constitution, the People's Saeima did not have the authority to change the form of the state, but was required to submit such changes to the people for approval in a referendum. On this basis, the declaration argued that all acts of the People's Saeima, including the request to join the Soviet Union, were ipso facto void.

See also
1940 Estonian parliamentary election
1940 Lithuanian parliamentary election

References

Latvia
One-party elections
1940 in Latvia
Parliamentary elections in Latvia